This is a list of the top selling singles and top sellings albums in Ireland in 2006.

Top selling singles 
"Jumbo Breakfast Roll" - Pat Shortt
"Hips Don't Lie" - Shakira featuring Wyclef Jean
"That's My Goal" - Shayne Ward
"Everytime We Touch" - Cascada
"Crazy" - Gnarls Barkley
"I Wish I Was a Punk Rocker (With Flowers in My Hair)" - Sandi Thom
"A Moment Like This" - Leona Lewis
"SexyBack" - Justin Timberlake
"Smack That" - Akon featuring Eminem
"No Promises" - Shayne Ward

Top selling albums
The Love Album - Westlife
Eyes Open - Snow Patrol
Ring of Fire: The Legend Of Johnny Cash - Johnny Cash
U218 Singles - U2
Gift Grub Volume 7 - Mario Rosenstock
Sam's Town - The Killers
Whatever People Say I Am, That's What I'm Not - Arctic Monkeys
Shayne Ward - Shayne Ward
Breakaway - Kelly Clarkson
Stadium Arcadium - Red Hot Chili Peppers

Notes:
 *Compilation albums are not included.

See also 
List of songs that reached number one on the Irish Singles Chart
List of artists who reached number one in Ireland

References

External links 
IRMA Official Site

2006 in Irish music
Ireland top selling
2006